The Lusty Men  is a 1952 Western film released by Wald-Krasna Productions and RKO Radio Pictures starring Susan Hayward, Robert Mitchum, Arthur Kennedy and Arthur Hunnicutt. The picture was directed by Nicholas Ray and produced by Jerry Wald and Norman Krasna from a screenplay by Wald, David Dortort, Horace McCoy, and Alfred Hayes that was based on the novel by Claude Stanush. The music score was by Roy Webb and the cinematography by Lee Garmes.

The film's world premiere was at the Majestic Theatre in San Antonio, Texas.

Plot
When longtime professional rodeo competitor Jeff McCloud is injured by an Brahman bull that he was trying to ride, he decides to quit. He hitchhikes to his childhood home, a decrepit place now owned by Jeremiah. Though it is run down, it is the dream home for cowhand Wes Merritt and his wife Louise, who are painstakingly saving Wes's meager wages to buy the house. Wes recognizes Jeff as a once-prominent rodeo rider and introduces himself, then helps Jeff gets a job at the same ranch. Wes, who has competed in some local rodeos and wants to continue, wants Jeff to help him improve his skills.

Wes enters a local rodeo behind his wife's back. When he does well, he joins the rodeo circuit, with Jeff as his partner and trainer. Louise is against the idea, but goes along. She makes her husband promise to quit when they have saved enough for the house.

As Louise becomes acquainted with rodeo life, she becomes increasingly disenchanted. Jeff's friend Booker Davis, once a champion competitor himself, is now a crippled old man with little to show for his efforts. When Buster Burgess is gored and killed by a bull, leaving a bitter widow, Louise can no longer bear to watch her husband compete. However, Wes is seduced by his great success and the money that he is winning. He refuses to quit when they have enough for the house.

Matters come to a head when Babs invites Wes to a party that she is throwing and makes a play for him. Louise fights back by wearing her only good dress and going to the party with Jeff. She pours a drink on Babs's head before leaving. Jeff asks her if she could love another man, but she says that she is true to Wes, and Wes tells Jeff that he is tired of taking all the risks and giving Jeff half of the prize money.

Jeff returns to the rodeo despite not being in shape. He gains back Wes's respect by doing well. Then, in the bronc riding event, his foot gets stuck in the stirrup after a successful ride and he is fatally injured. Seeing this, Wes comes to his senses and quits.

Cast

 Susan Hayward as Louise Merritt
 Robert Mitchum as Jeff McCloud
 Arthur Kennedy as Wes Merritt
 Arthur Hunnicutt as Booker Davis
 Frank Faylen as Al Dawson
 Walter Coy as Buster Burgess
 Carol Nugent as Rusty Davis, Booker's teenage daughter
 Maria Hart as Rosemary Maddox
 Lorna Thayer as Grace Burgess
 Burt Mustin as Jeremiah
 Karen King as Ginny Logan, Red's wife
 Jimmy Dodd as Red Logan, another rodeo competitor
 Eleanor Todd as Babs 
 Riley Hill as Hoag

Background
The screenplay was "suggested by" an article written by Claude Stanush that was published in Life magazine in 1946. The screenwriters credited were Horace McCoy and David Dortort, but some sources claim that Alfred Hayes and Andrew Solt contributed to the script without being credited.

Critical reception
In a contemporary review for The New York Times, critic Bosley Crowther praised the film's realism: "This vivid and pungent demonstration of the activities of professional 'saddle tramps'—the cowboys who scratch erratic livings on the circuit of the Western rodeos—gives such a harsh, discouraging insight into this form of commercialized sport that every backyard bronc-buster who sees it should go back to being a railroad engineer. ... Director Nicholas Ray has really captured the muscle and thump of rodeos."

On Rotten Tomatoes the film holds a 100% approval rating based on reviews from 15 critics, with an average rating of 8.2 out of 10. 
Dave Kehr of the Chicago Reader calls it "[a] masterpiece by Nicholas Ray—perhaps the most melancholy and reflective of his films (1952)." Gary Tooze of DVDbeaver also highly praises the film: "This is one of the best westerns—period. Mitchum is at his very best. It carries a documentary-style presence at times but is steeped in emotion. Absolute masterpiece."

See also
 List of American films of 1952

References

External links

 
 
 
 

1952 films
American Western (genre) films
American black-and-white films
1952 Western (genre) films
Films scored by Roy Webb
Films based on American novels
Films based on Western (genre) novels
Films directed by Nicholas Ray
Rodeo in film
1952 drama films
1950s English-language films
1950s American films